The third season  of Degrassi: The Next Generation, a Canadian serial teen drama television series, commenced airing in Canada on 17 September 2003 and concluded on 5 April 2004, consisting of twenty-two episodes. This season depicts the lives of a group of high school freshmen and sophomores as they deal with some of the challenges and issues teenagers face such as dysfunctional families, sex, homosexuality, homophobia, theft, self-harm, domestic violence, abortion, emancipation and relationships. 

Every episode is named after a song from the 1980s. Filming began on 26 May 2003, and ended in November 2003.

The third season aired Wednesdays at 8:30 p.m. on CTV, a Canadian terrestrial television network, and premiered with a sixty-minute special, "Father Figure", which form the first two episodes of the season. When the season returned to the schedules in January 2004 following a break over the Christmas period, it aired on Mondays at 8:30 p.m. In the United States, it was broadcast on the Noggin cable channel during its programming block for teenagers, The N. The season was released on DVD as a three disc boxed set on 28 March 2006 by Alliance Atlantis Home Entertainment in Canada, and by FUNimation Entertainment in the US. The show is also available on iTunes.

The season was watched by 669,000 viewers in Canada and became the most-watched domestic drama series, while in the US it averaged 250,000 viewers an episode. It won a total of five awards from the Directors Guild of Canada Awards, the Gemini Awards and the Young Artist Awards, and was described as "groundbreaking", "bold", and the show others in the same genre "should take a cue from", although that groundbreaking boldness caused two episodes of the season to be banned from US television screens for three years and when it was finally aired, it was rated "TV-14," even though more intense episodes still received Degrassi's usual "TV-PG" in the United States.

Cast

Main cast
 Shane Kippel as Gavin "Spinner" Mason (20 episodes)
 Lauren Collins as Paige Michalchuk (19 episodes)
 Aubrey Graham as Jimmy Brooks (17 episodes)
 Jake Epstein as Craig Manning (17 episodes)
 Miriam McDonald as Emma Nelson (15 episodes)
 Cassie Steele as Manuela "Manny" Santos (15 episodes)
 Stefan Brogren as Archie "Snake" Simpson (15 episodes)
 Andrea Lewis as Hazel Aden (15 episodes)
 Melissa McIntyre as Ashley Kerwin (15 episodes)
 Adamo Ruggiero as Marco Del Rossi (15 episodes)
 Ryan Cooley as James Tiberius "J.T." Yorke (14 episodes)
 Stacey Farber as Ellie Nash (13 episodes)
 Sarah Barrable-Tishauer as Liberty Van Zandt (13 episodes)
 Jake Goldsbie as Toby Isaacs (12 episodes)
 Amanda Stepto as Christine "Spike" Nelson (11 episodes)
 Pat Mastroianni as Joey Jeremiah (11 episodes)
 Daniel Clark as Sean Cameron (11 episodes)
 Dan Woods as Mr. Raditch (11 episodes)
 Stacie Mistysyn as Caitlin Ryan (8 episodes)
 Christina Schmidt as Terri McGreggor (7 episodes)

Recurring cast
 Melissa DiMarco as Daphne Hatzilakos (8 episodes)
 Michael Kinney as Coach Darryl Armstrong (8 episodes)
 Mike Lobel as Jay Hogart (8 episodes)
 Katie Lai as Kendra Mason (8 episodes)
 Linlyn Lue as Ms. Laura Kwan  (7 episodes)
 Daniel Morrison as Chris Sharpe  (7 episodes)
 Alexa Steele as Angela Jeremiah (6 episodes)
 Elisa Moolecherry as Sydney (6 episodes)
 John Bregar as Dylan Michalchuk (6 episodes)
 Skye Regan as Student (6 episodes)
 Deanna Casaluce as Alex Nuñez (5 episodes)
 Travis Donegan as Towerz (4 episodes)
 Ephraim Ellis as Rick Murray (3 episodes)
 Kim Roberts as Ms. Smith (3 episodes)
 Billy Khouri as Tomas (3 episodes)
 J.P. Richards as Waiter (3 episodes)
 Cathy Keenan as Liz O'Rourke (2 episodes)
 Jonathan Torrens as Shane McKay (2 episodes)
 Anastasia Koop as Young Emma (2 episodes)
 Christie MacFadyen as Elspeth (2 episodes)
 Kit Weyman as Sully (2 episodes)
 Sugith Varughese as Dr. Moragoda (2 episodes)
 Roger McKeen as Mr. Ehl (2 episodes)
 Pip as Wendy (2 episodes)
 Kris Holden-Ried as Scott "Tracker" Cameron (2 episodes)
 Livingstone Beaumont as The Dot GRILL Manager (2 episodes)
 Andrew Littleproud and Nicholas Littleproud as Jack Simpson (2 episodes)
 David Rosser as Pilot (2 episodes)
 Jeannie Calleja as Elf Girl Taking Picture (2 episodes)
 Bailey Corneal as Amy (2 episodes)
 Marie V. Cruz as Mrs. Julietta Santos (2 episodes)
 Artine Tony Browne as Substitute Teacher (2 episodes)
 Tom Melissis as Mr. Dom Perino (2 episodes)

Guest stars
 Angela Deiseach as Erica Farrell (1 episode)
 Maureen Deiseach as Heather Farrell (1 episode)
 Malcolm Xerxes as Dr. McKay (1 episode)
 George Stanchev as Tough Guy (1 episode)
 Veronica Hurnick as Police Officer (1 episode)
 Maria Vacratsis as Sheila (1 episode)
 Mony Yassir as Nadia Jamir (1 episode)
 Neil Hope as Wheels (1 episode)
 Kirsten Kieferle as Mrs. Nash (1 episode)
 Daniel Lévesque as Colonel Nash (1 episode)
 Jennifer Podemski as Ms. Chantel Sauvé (1 episode)
 Christopher Tai as Teen Hotline Guy (1 episode)
 Sean Persaud as DJ Jacob Sharpe (1 episode)
 Phylicia Manning as Melanda (1 episode)
 Jim Thorburn as Mr. Falcone (1 episode)
 Rachel Puchkoff as Baby Mama #1 (1 episode)
 Tricia Brioux as Councellor (1 episode)
 Cintija Ašperger as Mrs. Murray (1 episode)
 Geoffrey Bowes as Todd McGreggor (1 episode)
 Chris Woodward as himself (1 episode)
 Tony Sciara as Mr. Del Rossi (1 episode)
 Brona Brown as Mrs. Louisa Del Rossi (1 episode)
 Darryl Armstrong as Tom (1 episode)
 Robin Craig as Mrs. Mason (1 episode)
 Kathy Imrie as Nurse (1 episode)
 Paul Fracassi as Lil' Elvis (1 episode)
 Howard Glassman as Announcer (1 episode)
 Maria Ricossa as Kate Kerwin (1 episode)
 Marcus Wells as Big Elvis (1 episode)
 Stephen Arbuckle as Montreal Crew Guy (1 episode)
 Michael Favell as Security Guard #2 (1 episode)
 Marcello Melea as Degrassi Party Guy (1 episode)
 Kevin Rushton as Security Guard #3 (1 episode)
 Guy Schierau as EMS Worker (1 episode)
 Billy Ray Cyrus as Duke the Limo Driver (1 episode)

Crew
The season was produced by Epitome Pictures in association CTV. Funding was provided by The Canadian Film or Video Production Tax Credit and the Ontario Film and Television Tax Credit, the Canadian Television Fund and BCE-CTV Benefits, The Shaw Television Broadcast Fund, the Independent Production Fund, Mountain Cable Program, and RBC Royal Bank.

The executive producers are Epitome Pictures' CEO and Degrassi: The Next Generation co-creator Linda Schuyler, and her husband, Epitome president Stephen Stohn. Degrassi: The Next Generation co-creator Yan Moore served as the creative consultant and David Lowe is the line producer. Aaron Martin is the executive story editor. At the beginning of the season James Hurst served as the story editor, with Shelley Scarrow as junior story editor; by the end of the season they had been promoted to senior story editor and story editor, respectively. Brandon Yorke also served as a story editor, and Nicole Demerse became a story editor midway through the season. The editor is Stephen Withrow, Stephen Stanley is the production designer, and the cinematographers are Gavin Smith, David Perrauit, and Phil Earnshaw.

The writers for the season are Christine Alexiou, Tassie Cameron, Sean Carley, Craig Cornell, Nicole Demerse, James Hurst, Sean Jara, Aaron Martin, Yan Moore, Shelley Scarrow, Rebecca Schechter, Jana Sinyor, and Brendon Yorke. John Bell, Phil Earnshaw, Allan Eastman, Eleanore Lindo, Bruce McDonald, Andrew Potter, and Stefan Scaini directed the episodes.

When production of season three began, someone with the username "ExecProducer" started a thread on the official Degrassi: The Next Generation website, revealing production details, guest actors, scheduling information and DVD release details. He actually referred to himself as "Stephen Stohn" in one post, although this was not officially confirmed until the release of Degrassi: Generations - The Official 411 guidebook in 2005, when Stohn confirmed it was him.

Reception
In Canada the third season of Degrassi: The Next Generation was the most-watched domestic drama amongst adults 18 to 49, and the most-watched domestic drama series overall. It received an average of 669,000 viewers, an increase of 44% compared to season two. In the US, the season averaged 250,000 viewers.

Following season finale, the San Jose Mercury News said "If they [Everwood, The O.C., and One Tree Hill] want to be taken seriously, the shows could take a cue from Canadian drama Degrassi: The Next Generation, which ... addresses the same gritty teen issues without being far-fetched", and Tim Goodman of the San Francisco Chronicle echoed that by adding "Degrassi: The Next Generation has cultivated a loyal audience by avoiding the sugar-coating niceties of old-school teen TV and by treating those 10- to 14-year-olds as, well, not adults per se, but definitely maturing viewers. Degrassi focuses on a high school with a disparate student body, with countless individual stories to tell (which is why the franchise has lasted this long). There's nothing corny or sweet about "Degrassi" as it boldly tackles everything from obesity to date rape, thongs to drugs". Others, such as The Advocate gave praise and said the series was breaking new ground by depicting a gay romance between two teenaged boys.

Two of the episodes of season three were considered "too honest" for US viewers, as they portrayed a fourteen-year-old girl having an abortion, and having no regrets later, and The N refused to air the episodes. On the decision, The N said, "It's a serious episode and the summer [schedule] is all lighthearted", but "unrelated to any policy position regarding abortion." The refusal caused an uproar amongst the show's US fans, over 6000 of whom signed a petition calling the decision "unjust and asinine", and even attracted the attention of newspapers and media in Canada and the US, with The New York Times reporting on the portrayal of abortion on television.

The season won a total of five awards and six more nominations from various bodies. At the 2004 Directors Guild of Canada Awards, "Holiday" won "Outstanding Achievement in a Television Series - Family" and garnered a nomination for Stephen Stanley for "Outstanding Achievement in Production Design - Television Series". "Pride" won Aaron Martin, James Hurst and Shelley Scarrow the award for "Best Youth Script" at the Canadian Screenwriting Awards, given out annually by the Writers Guild of Canada, and "Best Direction in a Children's or Youths' Program or Series" at the Gemini Awards. The series also won the Gemini for "Best Children's or Youth Fiction Program or Series". Jake Epstein was nominated for "Best Performance in a Children's or Youth Program or Series" for his acting in "Should I Stay or Should I Go?", and Shelley Scarrow, Nicole Demerse and James Hurst were nominated for "Best Writing for a Children's or Youth Program or Series" for "Accidents Will Happen". The series received a nomination for "Outstanding Drama Series" at the 15th GLAAD Media Awards, which honor the media for their portrayal of the LGBT community and the issues that affect their lives. Jake Epstein was nominated for "Best Performance in a TV Comedy Series Leading Young Actor" at the Young Artist Awards, Alex Steele was nominated for "Best Performance in a TV Comedy Series Young Actress Age Ten or Younger", and the show won "Best Family TV Series (Comedy or Drama)".

Episodes
In the United States, Noggin's The N block aired season three in two separate runs as it had done with the second season. The first wave of episodes aired between 3 October 2003 and 19 December 2003, and the second wave from 4 June 2004 to 6 August 2004. Episodes fourteen and fifteen, the "banned" episodes, were finally broadcast on 26 August 2006, three years after their original Canadian broadcast during an "Every Degrassi Episode Ever" Marathon.

In Canada, episode 313 "This Charming Man" aired before the Christmas-themed episode 311/312 "Holiday".

This list is by order of production, as they appear on the DVD.

DVD release
The DVD release of season three was released by Alliance Atlantis Home Entertainment in Canada, and by FUNimation Entertainment in the US on 28 March 2006 after it had completed broadcast on television. It was released in Australia by Shock Records on 13 April 2011. As well as every episode from the season, the DVD release features bonus material including Audio commentaries, deleted scenes, and bloopers. Currently Season 3 Isn't Being Released On DVD by any Studio in Australia

References

Notes

External links
Season 3 episode synopses at CTV Television Network
 List of Degrassi: The Next Generation episodes at IMDB.

Degrassi: The Next Generation seasons
2003 Canadian television seasons
2004 Canadian television seasons